

Season 
Mazzola and Beltrami acquired on transfers, Roberto Mozzini (centre-back) and Domenico Caso (right winger) for a team who - in previous years - was told did not win due to the lack of planning. The line-up was completed by:
Bordon (goalkeeper), Baresi and Pasinato (right and left full-back), Bini (sweeper and captain), Oriali (half-back), Marini (midfielder), Beccalossi (playmaker), Muraro (left winger) and Altobelli (centre-forward).

Inter retained the top of the league since matchday 1, beating Pescara 2–0. Autumnal highlights resulted to be the wins over Milan (2–0 with both goals scored by Beccalossi) and Juventus (4–0 with a hat-trick of Altobelli and a goal for Muraro). Toward the end of the first half, Inter lost some points losing to Roma and drawing with Fiorentina and Ascoli. However, by mid-season Inter was in first place with 21 points, two over the reigning champion of Milan. In the second half of the league, Inter earned another 20 points leaving all opponents behind. Their 12th Scudetto was won on 27 April 1980, with a 2–2 draw against Roma in which Mozzini scored his only goal of his Inter career. The final record was of 14 wins, 13 draws and three losses for a total of 41 points, three more than Juventus (38) and five more than Milan (36). During the 30 games, the side scored 44 goals with 11 different players (in order: Oriali, Altobelli, Beccalossi, Marini, Bini, Muraro, Pasinato, Baresi, Caso, Ambu and Mozzini). Altobelli hit the target for 15 times: just Roberto Bettega managed to do better, scoring 16 goals.

Squad

Competitions

Serie A

League table

Matches

Coppa Italia 

First round

Quarterfinals

UEFA Cup 

First round

Second round

Statistics

League result 

2 points were awarded for every win, so Inter collected 41 points instead 56.

Player statistics 
Appearances and goals are referred to domestic league.

References

Sources 
- RSSSF Italy 1979/80

Inter Milan seasons
Internazionale Milano
Italian football championship-winning seasons